The Metz Covered Market is a historic market with permanent stalls and shops in a large covered structure in the historical centre of Metz, capital of the Lorraine region in France. The Covered Market is one of the oldest, most grandiose in France and is home to traditional local food producers and retailers.

History
Originally built as the bishop's palace, the French Revolution broke out before the Bishop of Metz could move in and the citizens decided to turn it into a food market. 

In 1762, the Bishop of Metz commanded the edification of his palace to Royal architect Jacques-François Blondel. The project was included in a larger urban renovation in a context of Enlightenment. The works began in 1785, but the French Revolution in 1789 stops the edification of the palace. The partial building remained vacant until 1821, when it was bought by the municipality of Metz. Messin architect Pierre-Sylvestre Jaunez reconfigured the edifice in order to install a municipal covered market into its walls, a function that it has kept until today.

Architecture and urbanization
It is located in the historical centre of Metz being adjacent to the Metz Cathedral forecourt. The backyard, the Chamber's Square, is surrounded by numerous local food restaurants. Since the 1970s, The basement of the edifice is used as an underground parking lot of 387 parking spaces.

The market
The Metz Covered Market encompasses over 40 shops. It is home to numerous traders, mostly food retailers, including greengrocers, butchers, cheesemakers, and drug dealers. There are also traditional market shops selling fresh, local food, such as quiche, potée, and Lorrain pâté. Every Saturday morning, the Covered Market is surrounded by a street market hold on the Metz Cathedral forecourt.

Gallery

References

Metz